Francis P. Keilman House is a historic home located at St. John, Lake County, Indiana.  It was built about 1857, and is a two-story, side hall plan balloon frame dwelling with Italianate style design elements.  It has a front gable roof and a rear addition built about 1900.  Also on the property are the contributing wood frame stable (c. 1890) with a garage addition (c. 1940) and a wood frame rabbit hutch (c. 1940).

It was listed in the National Register of Historic Places in 2013.

References

Houses on the National Register of Historic Places in Indiana
Italianate architecture in Indiana
Houses completed in 1857
Buildings and structures in Lake County, Indiana
National Register of Historic Places in Lake County, Indiana
1857 establishments in Indiana